Say What may refer to:

Books
Say What? - Talk like a local without putting your foot in it, by Lonely Planet, 2004 

Say What? by Margaret Peterson Haddix and James Bernardin 2005

Film and TV
 Say What?, an MTV television series in the 1990s

Games
 Say What?! (video game) Sony music game

Music
 Say What! (Stevie Ray Vaughan song), a track by Stevie Ray Vaughan from the album Soul to Soul, 1985
 Say What! (Trouble Funk album), 1986 live album
 "Say What" (LL Cool J song), a song by LL Cool J
 "Say What", a song by Kovas (musician) 
"Say What", single by Jesse Winchester, 1981